The second cabinet of Edmund Joensen was the government of the Faroe Islands from 11 June 1996 until 15 May 1998, with Edmund Joensen from Sambandsflokkurin (SB) as Prime Minister. The other parties of the coalition were: People's Party (Fólkaflokkurin) (FF), Workers' Union (Verkamannafylkingin) (VMF) og Self-Government Party (Sjálvstýrisflokkurin) (SF). The Self-Government Party, with Sámal Petur í Grund as minister, left the government on 1 December 1997.

References 

Cabinets of the Faroe Islands
1996 in the Faroe Islands
1997 in the Faroe Islands
1998 in the Faroe Islands